Baracksdubs is a popular YouTube channel and series that uses Barack Obama speeches to create cover songs, generally of popular songs. The channel was created by Fadi Saleh as a then-freshman student of the University of Tennessee. The channel was a Maker Studios partner from 2012 to 2015, when Saleh formed his own company, Spare Time Entertainment.

Episodes

Media coverage
The videos have been featured on Huffington Post, Gawker, Rolling Stone, Yahoo!, Mashable, and several other online news publications.

References

Cultural depictions of Barack Obama
2012 web series debuts
2010s YouTube series
Maker Studios channels
Internet memes introduced in 2012